The Lavochkin La-250 "Anakonda" was a high-altitude interceptor aircraft prototype developed in the Soviet Union by the Lavochkin design bureau in the 1950s. Its nickname "Anaconda" was invented during the flight test and referred to both the elongated body shape as well as the relatively critical flight characteristics of the machine.

Development
By the mid-1950s, it became obvious that subsonic cannon-armed fighters such as the Yakovlev Yak-25 would be unable to intercept fast high-altitude targets like the upcoming generation of strategic jet bombers. Consequently, in 1953 Lavochkin OKB proposed addition of an air-to-air missile system to the Berkut air-defense system. Tasked with defense of Moscow, the Berkut system consisted of a large network of radars and surface-to-air missile sites as well as ground-controlled interceptor aircraft. Lavochkin's proposed missile, the G-300 utilized a guidance system based on vacuum tubes and was so heavy (about 1,000 kg (2,200 lb)) that no fighter in the Soviet arsenal could carry it. Instead, a Tupolev Tu-4 bomber (Soviet version of the Boeing B-29 Superfortress) was modified to carry four G-300s under the wings, with the whole system receiving designation G-310. Although G-310 made ten flights in 1952, the system was abandoned as impractical.

In November 1952, the Soviet government ordered development of Kompleks K-15 (Complex K-15, a notion analogous to USAF's "weapon system" concept). K-15 was to consist of an "interceptor 250" (later designated La-250) carrying "Type 275" guided missiles. Initial guidance was to be from Vozdukh-1 ground control with terminal onboard radar guidance for the last  and automatic missile firing by the fire control system when in range. Missile "275" was projected to weigh  and, powered by a liquid fuel rocket motor, its top speed was to exceed . La-250 was to carry two "275" missiles semi-recessed into the underside of the fuselage in a tandem arrangement.

The first flight took place on 16 July 1956 by Andrei G. Kochetkov. Problems with the K-15U radar and Klimov VK-9 engines forced a radical redesign of the aircraft to use the K-15M radar and, more importantly, much less powerful Lyulka AL-7F engines. The new airframe with a smaller fuselage and a delta wing instead of the earlier swept wing was designated La-250A. 
The "275" missiles were now carried on underwing pylons. The lighter airframe was not enough to overcome the weaker engines, and projected performance suffered compared to La-250. While busy redesigning the aircraft, Lavochkin OKB also had to develop new variants of the "275" missile - the semi-active radar homing "277," the nuclear-armed "279," and solid fuel rocket-powered "280." The first La-250A prototype was finally rolled out on 16 June 1956.

Test flights of the five prototypes were plagued by crashes caused by failures of the hydraulic boost system and landing gear as well as poor forward visibility (the latter was corrected with fitting of a new slightly "drooped" nose). La-250A made a single test flight in 1956, only 6 flights in 1957, and a mere 14 flights in 1958. Frustrated by the lack of progress, Soviet Air Force stopped all work on the K-15 system in 1959. Lessons learned with K-15 were used to develop new interceptor system requirements which led to the Tupolev Tu-28 interceptor.

Survivors
One of Lavochkin La-250A prototypes is on display at the Central Air Force Museum at Monino, outside of Moscow, Russia.

Specifications (La-250A)

See also

Sources
 Kopenhagen, W (ed.), Das große Flugzeug-Typenbuch, Transpress, 1987, 
 Ла-250 Анаконда – Уголок неба. 2008

250
Abandoned military aircraft projects of the Soviet Union
1950s Soviet fighter aircraft
Twinjets
Delta-wing aircraft
Mid-wing aircraft
Aircraft first flown in 1956